The French Office for Biodiversity (OFB; French: Office français de la biodiversité) is an établissement public à caractère administratif within the Government of France. It is under the control of both the Ministry of the Ecological Transition and Ministry of Agriculture and Food. It conducts research and enforces government policies on wildlife and the environment.

The OFB, located in Vincennes, was established on 1 January 2020 as the new entity succeeding the French Agency for Biodiversity (primarily in charge of national parks and other protected areas) and the National Office for Hunting and Wildlife. It has 2,800 agents (including 1,900 in territorial entities and in the overseas territories). Of these agents, 1,800 are environmental inspectors exercising the police powers of the OFB.

History 
The OFB was founded in 2020 with the merging of the French Agency for Biodiversity and the National Hunting and Wildlife Office of France. The Agency for Biodiversity had been founded in 2016 through a merger of National Office for Water and Aquatic Environments (the former Higher Fisheries Council) with the National Park Service of France and the Marine Protected Areas Agency.

Responsibilities
OFB conducts research and provides expertise on species, environments and their uses. It provides support for government environmental policies and assists managers of national areas. CFB also strives to educate the public on biodiversity issues and gain their support for conservation.

Environmental police

OFB contributes to the exercise of administrative and judicial policies relating to water (pollution of the resource, damage to wetlands or the coast), natural areas, flora and wild fauna (game species or protected, fight against trafficking in species), hunting (counter-poaching, strengthening hunting security) and fishing. The OFB also organizes the review of the hunting license and issues the license.

To fulfill this mission, environmental inspectors have certain criminal investigation powers enabling them to search for and find certain environmental offenses. Commissioned by ministerial decision and sworn in by the judicial authority, they exercise their judicial police missions under the authority of the public prosecutor. The environmental police also includes the administrative police. 

Within the OFB, environmental technicians exercise these missions under the authority of the departmental prefect. They issue technical opinions on projects subject to administrative instruction at the request of the prefect, and carry out administrative checks on compliance with environmental regulations.

Organisation
 National level, where the policy and strategy of the OFB are defined and managed (bureaus of the OFB)
 Regional level, where coordination and territorial variation are exercised (regional bureau)
 Departemental and local levels, of operational and specific implementation (departemental services, front offices, nine marine natural parks and the Agoa marine mammal sanctuary, and  26 nature reserves)

See also
List of national parks of France

References

Government agencies of France
Law enforcement agencies of France